Scott Wulferdingen is a retired American soccer forward who played professionally in the American Professional Soccer League and USISL.

Wulferdingen attended California State University, Chico, where he played on the Wildcats soccer team from 1987 to 1989.  He was a 1989 NCAA Division II First Team All American.  In 1989, Wulferdingen played as an amateur with the San Francisco Bay Blackhawks in the Western Soccer League.  In 1990, Wulferdingen turned professional with the Blackhawks who were now playing in the American Professional Soccer League.  That year, the Blackhawks went to the championship.  Wulferdingen finished his time with the Blackhawks in 1991.  He played for the Chico Rooks from 1993 to 1995.

References

Living people
American soccer players
American Professional Soccer League players
Chico Rooks players
Chico State Wildcats men's soccer players
San Francisco Bay Blackhawks players
USISL players
USL Second Division players
Western Soccer Alliance players
Association football forwards
Year of birth missing (living people)